Fond Cochon, is a town in Haiti in the Roseaux commune in the Corail Arrondissement, in the Grand'Anse department.

References

Populated places in Grand'Anse (department)